Chad George (born April 30, 1982) is a retired American professional mixed martial artist. Chad has fought in the WEC, Bellator, Tachi Palace, BAMMA and many other MMA Organizations. He also competes in Brazilian jiu-jitsu and has been featured in Metamoris Challengers, Fight To Win and the Eddie Bravo Invitational. 

In 2017 Chad become the first ever bantamweight Combat Jiu-Jitsu World Champion.

Chad holds a notable victory over UFC flyweight Kai Kara-France.

Background
In 2000 George was a U.S. high school All-American wrestler at Rancho Cordova High School and also has had an accomplished career in Brazilian jiu-jitsu. In 2010, George won his first Brazilian IBJJF Jiu-Jitsu (BJJ) no-gi world championship as a blue belt. In 2012, George captured the purple belt no-gi world title, and then later in 2014 he won the IBJJF no-gi brown belt world championship.

In 2016 Chad received his Black Belt in Brazilian Jiu Jitsu.

Mixed martial arts career

Early career
George made his professional MMA debut in April 2005.

WEC
In his WEC debut, George defeated John Hosman at WEC 45 on December 19, 2009 via unanimous decision.

In his second fight for the promotion, George faced Scott Jorgensen at WEC 47, on March 6, 2010. George lost via a standing guillotine choke submission in the first round.

George next faced Antonio Banuelos at WEC 51 on September 30, 2010. George lost the fight by decision and was subsequently released from his contract with Zuffa, LLC after the UFC/WEC merger in December 2010.

Post-WEC
George would later return to competitive fighting with a submission win over Bobby Sanchez at BAMMA USA: Badbeat 2 on June 11, 2011. In December 2011, George traveled to New Zealand to compete against native champion and now UFC flyweight contender, Kai Kara-France, at The Cage 2; George won with a first-round KO.

Bellator MMA
George made his debut for Bellator MMA on April 10, 2015 at Bellator 136. George faced Mark Vorgeas and won the fight via technical submission in the first round. The fight is notable as Vorgeas went unconscious during a submission, George notices this and refused to punch his opponent instead choosing to argue with the referee until the referee noticed that Vorgeas was indeed unconscious.

Occupation: Fighter
An 85-minute feature film documentary by Bavayou Films was produced following eight months in the life of Chad George. Later, it was released by Filmbuff & Cinetic Media, made available worldwide via Netflix, Video On Demand, iTunes and Amazon video.

Championships and accomplishments

Combat jiu-jitsu
Eddie Bravo Invitational
 EBI Bantamweight World Championship (One time)

Mixed martial arts record

|Win
|align=center|18–8
|Hector Valenzuela
|Submission (Arm triangle)
|LXF 2||
|align=center|2
|align=center|4:01
|Burbank, California, United States
|
|-
|Win
|align=center|17–8
|James Barnes
|TKO (doctor stoppage)
|Bellator 192||
|align=center|2
|align=center|5:00
|Inglewood, California, United States
|
|-
|Win
|align=center|16–8
|Mark Voregas
|Technical Submission (Von Flue choke)
|Bellator 136||
|align=center|1
|align=center|3:37
|Irvine, California, United States
|Featherweight bout.
|-
|Win
|align=center|15–8
|Sam Rodriguez
|Submission (rear naked choke)
|NFA Valley Invasion||
|align=center|1
|align=center|1:57
|Woodland Hills, California, United States
|Featherweight bout.
|-
|Loss
|align=center|14–8
|Cody Gibson 
|Submission (guillotine choke)
|TWC 18: Halloween Havoc III
|
|align=center|1
|align=center|4:39
|Porterville, California, United States
|Catchweight (140 lb) bout.
|-
|Loss
|align=center|14–7
|Joe Soto
|Technical Submission (guillotine choke)
|Tachi Palace Fights 13
|
|align=center|2
|align=center|2:01
|Lemoore, California, United States
|
|-
|Win
|align=center|14–6
|Shad Smith
|Submission (arm-triangle choke)
|BAMMA USA: Badbeat 5
|
|align=center|1
|align=center|1:56
|Commerce, California, United States
|Featherweight bout.
|-
|Win
|align=center|13–6
|Kai Kara-France
|KO (punches)
|The Cage 2: USA vs. New Zealand
|
|align=center|1
|align=center|2:32
|Whakatane, New Zealand
|
|-
|Win
|align=center|12–6
|Bobby Sanchez
|Submission (arm-triangle choke)
|BAMMA USA: Badbeat 2
|
|align=center|1
|align=center|2:32
|Commerce, California, United States
|
|-
|Loss
|align=center|11–6
|Antonio Banuelos
|Decision (unanimous)
|WEC 51
|
|align=center|3
|align=center|5:00
|Broomfield, Colorado, United States
|
|-
|Loss
|align=center|11–5
|Scott Jorgensen
|Submission (standing guillotine choke)
|WEC 47
|
|align=center|1
|align=center|0:31
|Columbus, Ohio, United States
|
|-
|Win
|align=center|11–4
|John Hosman
|Decision (unanimous)
|WEC 45
|
|align=center|3
|align=center|5:00
|Las Vegas, Nevada, United States
|
|-
|Win
|align=center|10–4
|Alvin Cacdac
|Decision (split)
|Call to Arms I
|
|align=center|3
|align=center|5:00
|Ontario, California, United States
|
|-
|Win
|align=center|9–4
|Lonnie Wright
|TKO (doctor stoppage)
|Fist Series: WinterFist II 2008 
|
|align=center|3
|align=center|1:26
|Irvine, California, United States
|
|-
|Win
|align=center|8–4
|Dan Sullivan
|Submission (D'arce choke)
|Freestyle Cage Fighting 
|
|align=center|1
|align=center|3:03
|Shawnee, Oklahoma, United States
|
|-
|Win
|align=center|7–4
|Rick Screeton
|Submission (armbar)
|Valor Fighting: Fight Night 
|
|align=center|1
|align=center|1:07
|Tustin, California, United States
|
|-
|Win
|align=center|6–4
|Rick Screeton
|TKO (slam and punches) 
|Tuff-N-Uff: Thompson vs. Troyer
|
|align=center|1
|align=center|0:39
|Las Vegas, Nevada, United States
|
|-
|Loss
|align=center|5–4
|Matt Troyer
|Decision (unanimous)
|HOOKnSHOOT: Bodog Fight Women's Tournament
|
|align=center|3
|align=center|5:00
|Evansville, Indiana, United States
|
|-
|Win
|align=center|5–3
|Pete Sabala
|Submission (armbar)
|OctoberFist 2007: Fight Night on Fright Night
|
|align=center|1
|align=center|0:45
|Orange County, California, United States
|
|-
|Loss
|align=center|4–3
|Matteus Lahdesmaki
|Submission (rear-naked choke) 
|Bodog Fight: Vancouver
|
|align=center|1
|align=center|2:59
|Vancouver, British Columbia, Canada
|
|-
|Loss
|align=center|4–2
|Todd Guimond
|Technical Submission (rear-naked choke) 
|Total Fighting Alliance 6
|
|align=center|3
|align=center|1:31
|Santa Monica, California, United States
|
|-
|Win
|align=center|4–1
|Todd Guimond
|Submission (rear-naked choke)
|Total Fighting Alliance 5
|
|align=center|1
|align=center|1:43
|Santa Monica, California, United States
|
|-
|Loss
|align=center|3–1
|Todd Guimond
|Submission (rear-naked choke) 
|Total Fighting Alliance 4
|
|align=center|1
|align=center|N/A
|Carson, California, United States
|
|-
|Win
|align=center|3–0
|Maurice Eazel
|Submission (gullotine choke)
|Total Fighting Alliance 3
|
|align=center|2
|align=center|1:14
|Hollywood, California, United States
|
|-
|Win
|align=center|2–0
|Daniel Barizia
|TKO (doctor stoppage)
|Total Fighting Alliance 2
|
|align=center|N/A
|align=center|N/A
|Carson, California, United States
|
|-
|Win
|align=center|1–0
|Daniel Vasquez
|Submission (guillotine choke)
|Total Combat 8
|
|align=center|3
|align=center|N/A
|Tijuana, Mexico, Mexico
|

References

External links
 

1982 births
American male mixed martial artists
Mixed martial artists utilizing Brazilian jiu-jitsu
Living people
American practitioners of Brazilian jiu-jitsu
People awarded a black belt in Brazilian jiu-jitsu